Isotemnidae is an extinct family of notoungulate mammals known from the Paleocene (Las Flores Formation, Itaboraian) to Middle Miocene (Honda Group, Laventan) of South America.

References

Further reading 
 
 M. McKenna. 1956. Survival of primitive Notoungulates and Condylarths into the Miocene of Colombia. American Journal of Science 254:736-743

Toxodonts
Paleocene mammals
Eocene mammals
Oligocene mammals
Miocene mammals of South America
Langhian extinctions
Paleocene first appearances
Fossil taxa described in 1887
Taxa named by Florentino Ameghino
Prehistoric mammal families